Jonas Björkman and Max Mirnyi were the defending champions, but lost in quarterfinals to Fabrice Santoro and Nenad Zimonjić.

Paul Hanley and Kevin Ullyett won the title, defeating Mark Knowles and Daniel Nestor 6–2, 7–6(10–8) in the final.

Seeds
All seeds received a bye into the second round.

Draw

Finals

Top half

Bottom half

External links
 Main Draw

Doubles